Artemita is a genus of flies in the family Stratiomyidae.

Species
Artemita amenides (Walker, 1849)
Artemita argentea Osten Sacken, 1886
Artemita aurata (Macquart, 1846)
Artemita banksi James, 1971
Artemita bellardii Giglio-Tos, 1891
Artemita bequaerti (Curran, 1925)
Artemita brasiliana Lindner, 1964
Artemita centor (Curran, 1934)
Artemita convexa (Walker, 1854)
Artemita hieroglyphica (Wiedemann, 1830)
Artemita insularis James, 1962
Artemita latifrons (James, 1971)
Artemita nana (Bellardi, 1862)
Artemita peruviana Kertész, 1914
Artemita podexargenteus Enderlein, 1914

References

Stratiomyidae
Brachycera genera
Taxa named by Francis Walker (entomologist)
Diptera of North America
Diptera of South America